The 2010 FIM Team Ice Racing World Championship was the 32nd edition and the 2010 version of FIM Team Ice Racing World Championship season. The Final was held in Krasnogorsk, Moscow Oblast, Russia on 30–31 January 2010. The championship was won by Russia (50 points), who they beat Sweden (45 pts) and Austria (41 pts).

World Final

Results 

  Krasnogorsk, Moscow Oblast
 30–31 January 2010
City stadium "Zorkey" (Length: 400 m.)
Referee:  K. Gardell
Jury President:  J. Nadasdi
References

Heat details – Day One

Heat details – Day Two

See also 
 2010 Individual Ice Racing World Championship
 2010 Speedway World Cup in classic speedway
 2010 Speedway Grand Prix in classic speedway

References 

Ice speedway competitions
World Team
Ice